The Concerto for Viola and Orchestra is a musical composition for viola and orchestra by the American composer Walter Piston.  The work was written in 1957 for the violist Joseph de Pasquale, who first performed the piece with the Boston Symphony Orchestra on March 7, 1958.

Composition

Structure
The concerto has a duration of roughly 20 minutes and is cast in three movements:
Con moto moderato e flessible
Adagio con fantasia
Allegro vivo

Instrumentation
The work is scored for a solo viola and an orchestra consisting of a piccolo, two flutes, two oboes, cor anglais, two clarinets, bass clarinet, two bassoons, contrabassoon, four horns, two trumpets, three trombones, tuba, timpani, percussion, harp, and strings.

Reception
The music critic Andrew Farach-Colton of Gramophone wrote, "Piston's Concerto (1957) opens pensively, quickly builds to an aching climax (beginning around 4'00") with the first movement ending almost abruptly on a note of resignation. The central Adagio con fantasia is the work's emotional core, beginning in abject loneliness (sparely scored with wistful harmonies) but finds, in the final pages, a sweeter lyricism that prepares the listener perfectly for the playful syncopations of the exuberant finale."  Anthony Tommasini of The New York Times similarly observed:

References

Compositions by Walter Piston
1957 compositions
Piston, Walter